Isao Harimoto holds the Japanese record for most career hits with 3085, and is the only player with more than 3000 hits in Japan.

Players with 2,000 or more hits

 Stats updated as of end of 2021 season.

External links 
 Career Batting Data from Japanese Star Players, NPB Official Site (Japanese), BaseballGuru.com

See also
 List of Nippon Professional Baseball players with 1,000 runs batted in
 List of Nippon Professional Baseball earned run average champions
 Nippon Professional Baseball Most Valuable Player Award
 List of KBO Career Hits leaders

Nippon Professional Baseball